Mother Love is a 1916 British silent drama film directed by Maurice Elvey and starring Elisabeth Risdon, Fred Groves and Frank Stanmore.

Cast
 Elisabeth Risdon as Mary 
 Fred Groves as Alfie  
 Frank Stanmore 
 Guy Newall
 Dolly Tree

References

Bibliography
 Murphy, Robert. Directors in British and Irish Cinema: A Reference Companion. British Film Institute, 2006.

External links
 

1916 films
British drama films
British silent feature films
1910s English-language films
Films directed by Maurice Elvey
1916 drama films
British black-and-white films
1910s British films
Silent drama films